This is the list of governors of Languedoc :

Languedoc was a former province of France, which existed until 1789.

 1339–1345 : Jean de Marigny
 1352–1357 : John I, Count of Armagnac 
 1357–1361 : Jean de Valois 
 1361–1361 : Robert de Fiennes 
 1361–1364 : Arnoul d'Audrehem
 1364–1380 : Louis de Valois 
 1380–1380 : Gaston Phébus
 1380–1390 : Jean de Valois (second time) 
 1390–1401 : Louis de Sancerre 
 1401–1411 : Jean de Valois (third time)
 1411–1413 : Vacant 
 1413–1413 : Boucicaut 
 1413–1416 : Jean de Valois (fourth time) 
 1416–1419 : Vacant 
 1419–1420 : John I, Count of Foix 
 1420–1420 : dauphin Charles 
 1420–1424 : Charles I, Duke of Bourbon 
 1424–1425 : James II, Count of La Marche 
 1425–1436 : John I, Count of Foix (second time)
 1436–1440 : Vacant 
 1440–1466 : Charles, Count of Maine 
 1466–1488 : John II, Duke of Bourbon 
 1488–1503 : Peter II, Duke of Bourbon 
 1503–1512 : Vacant 
 1512–1526 : Charles III, Duke of Bourbon 
 1526–1563 : Anne de Montmorency 
 1563–1614 : Henri I de Montmorency 
 1614–1632 : Henri II de Montmorency 
 1632–1633 : Henri de Schomberg 
 1633–1644 : Charles de Schomberg 
 1644–1660 : Gaston, Duke of Orléans 
 1660–1666 : Armand de Bourbon, Prince of Conti 
 1666–1682 : Henri, Duke of Verneuil 
 1682–1737 : Louis Auguste, Duke of Maine 
 1737–1755 : Louis Auguste, Prince of Dombes 
 1755–1775 : Louis Charles, Count of Eu 
 1775–1788 : Louis Antoine de Gontaut

Former provinces of France
Lists of French nobility